The men's field hockey tournament at the 2006 Asian Games was held in Al-Rayyan Hockey Field, Doha, Qatar, from December 4 to December 14, 2006.

Squads

Results
All times are Arabia Standard Time (UTC+03:00)

Preliminary league

Pool A

Pool B

Classification 9th–10th

Classification 5th–8th

Semifinals

Classification 7th–8th

Classification 5th–6th

Final round

Semifinals

Bronze medal match

Gold medal match

Final standing

References

Results

External links
Official website

Men
Asian Games
2006